This is a list of notable meatball dishes. A meatball is ground or minced meat rolled into a small ball, sometimes along with other ingredients, such as bread crumbs, minced onion, eggs, butter, and seasoning. Meatballs are cooked by frying, baking, steaming, or braising in sauce. There are many types of meatballs using different types of meats and spices, and most cuisines have a version of the dish.

Meatball dishes

 Bakso – an Indonesian meatball or meat paste made from beef surimi. 
Bakso Bakar Malang - Roasted Bakso dish from Malang City, Indonesia. Usually served with spicy sauce. 
 Beef ball
 Bitterballen – a Dutch meatball prepared using beef or veal and other ingredients
 Chiftele 
 Faggot – a dish in the United Kingdom typically consisting of minced pork liver and heart, wrapped in bacon, with onion and breadcrumbs. It is often  cooked in a crock with gravy and served with peas and mashed potatoes. Faggots can also be made with beef.
 Fish ball
 Frikadeller – flat, pan-fried meatballs of minced meat, often likened to the Danish version of meatballs. The origin of the dish is unknown but the dish is most often associated with Danish cuisine specifically, or Scandinavian cuisine in general.
 Frikkadel –  a traditional Afrikaans dish comprising usually baked, but sometimes deep-fried, meatballs prepared with onion, bread, eggs, vinegar and spices.
 Gondi –  a Persian Jewish dish of meatballs made from ground lamb, veal or chicken traditionally served on Shabbat.
 Kibbeh – a Levantine dish made of bulgur (cracked wheat), minced onions, and finely ground lean beef, lamb, goat, or camel meat with Middle Eastern spices (cinnamon, nutmeg, clove, allspice). Some types of kibbeh are shaped into balls or patties, and baked, cooked in broth, or served raw. Kibbeh is considered to be the national dish of many Middle Eastern countries.
 Klopsiki – a Polish meatball dish often prepared using tomato sauce
 Königsberger Klopse – a German specialty of meatballs in a white sauce with capers
 Kotlet mielony – a Polish dish consisting of minced meat cutlet with eggs, bread crumbs, garlic, and salt and pepper rolled into a ball and fried with onions and butter
 Köttbullar – Swedish meatballs that are typically prepared with ground pork or a meat mix, diced onion, breadcrumbs and broth. Cream is sometimes used.
 Leberknödel – a traditional dish of German, Austrian and Czech cuisines. It is usually composed of beef liver, although in the German Palatinate region pork is used instead. The meat is ground and mixed with bread, eggs, parsley and various spices, often nutmeg or marjoram. In Austria spleen is often mixed with the liver in a 1/3 ratio. 
 Meatball pizza
 Meatball sandwich
 Meatball soup
 Meatballs with cuttlefish – a traditional catalan dish of meatballs with cuttlefish, these two elements are fused together in one of the many dishes of the Catalan version of surf'n'turf
 Mititei – a traditional Romanian dish of grilled ground meat rolls made from a mixture of beef, lamb and pork with spices, such as garlic, black pepper, thyme, coriander, anise, savory, and sometimes a touch of paprika. Sodium bicarbonate and broth or water are also added to the mixture.
 Mondeghili
 Nem nguội – Vietnamese meatballs that are a variation of the Nem nướng meatballs. They are small and rectangular in shape, and stuffed with vermicelli. The reddish meat is covered with peppers and typically a chili pepper. Very spicy, they are eaten almost exclusively as a cocktail snack.
 Nem nướng – (literally "grilled sausage"), is Vietnamese grilled pork sausage or grilled meatballs
 Pârjoale
 Pentol – a dish in Surabaya, Indonesia that can be prepared as vegetarian or with meat
 Perișoare
 Porcupines - ground-beef meatball, ingredients including chopped onions and long-grain rice. When cooked (traditionally in canned tomato soup) the rice projects from the meatball, creating the porcupine-look.
 Pork ball
 Poume d'oranges
 Skilpadjies – a traditional South African food consisting of lamb's liver wrapped in netvet (caul fat), which is the fatty membrane that surrounds the kidneys. Most cooks mince the liver, add coriander, chopped onion, salt and Worcestershire sauce then wrap balls of this mixture with the netvet and secure it with a toothpick. The balls, approximately 80 mm (3.1 in) in diameter, are normally barbecued (grilled over an open fire) and ready when the fat is crisp.
 Spaghetti with meatballs
 Steamed meatball – a common Cantonese dim sum dish
 Stewed meatball – also known as Lion's Head, it is a dish from the Huaiyang cuisine of eastern China, consisting of large pork meatballs stewed with vegetables. There are two varieties:  white (or plain), and red (红烧, cooked with soy sauce).
 Tsukune – Japanese chicken meatballs most often cooked yakitori style, but also can be fried or baked

Middle East and South Asia

Köfte is a family of meatball or meatloaf dishes found in South Asian, Middle Eastern, Balkan, and Central Asian cuisine. In the simplest form, koftas consist of balls of minced or ground meat—usually beef, chicken, lamb, or pork—mixed with spices or onions. In Turkey, meatballs are named after the places where they are respectively produced.
 Akçaabat meatballs – found traditionally in Akçaabat, Trabzon, Turkey
 Çiğ köfte – a raw meatball dish in Armenian, Kurdish, and Turkish cuisines
 Dry meatballs 
 Harput meatballs, large meatballs from Elazığ (formerly Harput), Turkey
 İnegöl meatballs, grilled meatballs from İnegöl, Turkey
 Islama köfte, grilled meatballs with toast from Adapazarı, Turkey
 Şiş köfte – a köfte or kebab variant in the Turkish cuisine. It consists of minced lamb, mutton, veal or beef, or a mixture of some of these meats with herbs, often including parsley and mint, on a şiş (skewer), grilled. 
 Smyrna meatballs, also called soutzoukakia Smyrneika (σουτζουκάκια σμυρνέικα) or İzmir köfte: elongated meatballs in spicy sauce
 Sulu köfte – a Turkish stew or thick soup (çorba) with köfte
 Tabriz meatballs (koofteh Tabrizi) – an Iranian stuffed meatball dish from Tabriz
 Tire meatballs – thin grilled meatballs with butter from Tire, İzmir, Turkey
 Van köfte, large meatballs from Van, Turkey
 Yuvarlakia – a Greek meatball made of beef and rice or bulgur and cooked in moist heat, served in egg-lemon sauce

Gallery

See also

 List of beef dishes
 List of fish dishes
 List of lamb dishes
 List of pork dishes

Notes

References

External links
 

Meatball Dishes